Niramaruthur  is a beautiful sandy coastal village and also a Gram panchayat in Tirur Taluk, Malappuram district in the state of Kerala, India. Tanur and Tirur are nearby municipal towns.

History
Niramaruthur was under Tanaloor Panchayat, and divided in 1997, the area included Unniyal beach, also canoli canal  joining in Ponnani is part of Niramaruthur area. The village was a part of the Kingdom of Tanur (Vettattnad) in medieval times. Now Niramaruthur Panchayarh administered by the Communist party. 

The name originated from Malabar and is related to the mountain valleys.

Wards of Niramarutur
{ "type": "ExternalData",  "service": "geoshape",  "ids": "Q13112911"}
Niramarutur Grama Panchayat is composed of the following 17 wards:

Transportation
Niramaruthur village connects to other parts of India through Tirur town.  National highway No.66 passes through Tirur and the northern stretch connects to Goa and Mumbai.  The southern stretch connects to Cochin and Trivandrum.  Highway No.966 goes to Palakkad and Coimbatore.  The nearest airport is at Kozhikode.  The nearest major railway station is at Tirur and Tanur.

Places of Interest
 Unniyal beach

Demographics
, Niramaruthur had a population of 25,547 with 12,391 males and 13,156 females.

References

Cities and towns in Malappuram district
Populated coastal places in India
Tirur area